Hodler may refer to:

 Ferdinand Hodler (1853–1918), Swiss painter
 17486 Hodler, asteroid named after Ferdinand Hodler
 Hector Hodler (1887–1920), Swiss esperantist
 Marc Hodler (1918–2006), Swiss sports functionary